Ivato may stand for:

Ivato International Airport - the airport of Antananarivo, Madagascar.
Ivato, a commune in Analamanga, in Madagascar.
Ivato, Ambositra (=Ivato Centre), a commune in Amoron'i Mania, in Madagascar.
Ivato, Vohipeno, a commune in Fitovinany, in Madagascar.
Ivato, Vondrozo, a commune in Atsimo-Atsinanana, in Madagascar.